The 2018 CS Golden Spin of Zagreb was held in December 2018 as part of the 2018–19 ISU Challenger Series. Medals were awarded in the disciplines of men's singles, ladies' singles, pair skating, and ice dancing.

Entries
The International Skating Union published the list of entries on November 12, 2018.

Changes to preliminary assignments

Results

Men

Ladies

Pairs

Ice dancing

References

External links
 2018 CS Golden Spin of Zagreb at the International Skating Union
 Croatian Skating Federation

CS Golden Spin of Zagreb
2018 in Croatian sport